Tabar Sara (also Romanized as Tabar Sarā; also known as Ţabarsā) is a village in Masal Rural District, in the Central District of Masal County, Gilan Province, Iran. At the 2006 census, its population was 160, in 43 families.

References 

Populated places in Masal County